John Drysdale (1862 – 15 February 1923) was an Australian cricketer. He played seven first-class cricket matches for Victoria between 1888 and 1890.

See also
 List of Victoria first-class cricketers

References

External links
 

1862 births
1923 deaths
Australian cricketers
Victoria cricketers
People from Castlemaine, Victoria